Tonight or Never may refer to:

 Tonight or Never (1931 film), a 1931 American film
 Tonight or Never (1941 film), a 1941 Swedish comedy film
 Tonight or Never (1961 film), a 1961 French film